The 2019–20 Wagner Seahawks men's basketball team represented Wagner College during the 2019–20 NCAA Division I men's basketball season. The Seahawks were led by eight-year head coach Bashir Mason. They played their home games at Spiro Sports Center on the school's Staten Island campus as members of the Northeast Conference. They finished the season 8–21, 5–13 in NEC play to finish in tenth place. They failed to qualify for the NEC tournament.

Previous season
The Seahawks finished the 2018–19 season 13–17 overall, 8–10 in NEC play to finish in seventh place. As the No. 7 seed in the NEC tournament, they were defeated in the quarterfinals by the eventual tournament champion, Fairleigh Dickinson.

Roster

Schedule and results

|-
!colspan=12 style=| Non-Conference Regular season

|-
!colspan=12 style=| NEC regular season

 

|-

Source

References

Wagner Seahawks men's basketball seasons
Wagner Seahawks
Wagner Seahawks men's basketball team
Wagner Seahawks men's basketball team